The 1903 Cork Senior Hurling Championship was the 17th staging of the Cork Senior Hurling Championship since its establishment by the Cork County Board in 1887.

Dungourney were the defending champions.

Blackrock won the championship following a 2-8 to 1-10 defeat of St. Finbarr’s in the final. This was their ninth championship title and their first title in five championship seasons.

Results

Final

Championship statistics

Miscellaneous

 Following their county championship success, Blackrock represent Cork in the inter-county championship. They become the sixth Cork team to win the All-Ireland title.
 The final is played in Turners Cross for the last time.

References

Cork Senior Hurling Championship
Cork Senior Hurling Championship